The Doctor Is Out may refer to:

Television
 "The Doctor Is Out" (The A-Team), a 1985 episode
 "The Doctor Is Out", a 1998 episode of The Spooktacular New Adventures of Casper
 "The Doctor Is Out" (Frasier), a 2003 episode
 "The Doctor Is Out", a 2003 episode of It's All Relative
 The Doctor Is Out ... Really Out, a 2005 installment in the McBride film series

Other uses
 Getting Away with Murder (play), a Sondheim–Furth collaboration first staged as The Doctor Is Out in 1995 
 "The Doctor Is Out", an autobiographical essay in the 2005 book Lolly Scramble by Tony Martin

See also 
 The Doctor Is In (disambiguation)